The 1940–41 Ranji Trophy was the seventh season of the Ranji Trophy. Nineteen teams took part in four zones in a knockout format. Maharashtra retained the title defeating Madras in the final. Maharashtra would enter and lose three more finals but as of 2014, 1940-41 remains their last Ranji title.

With cricket affected by the Second World War, Ranji Trophy was only regular domestic tournament that continued in the senior cricket nations.

Highlights
  Maharashtra won their first four matches on first innings lead and won only the final outright.
 Maharashtra made a Ranji record score of 798 against Northern India in the semifinal, batting for most of the first three days. Originally scheduled as a three-day match, the semifinal was extended to a fourth day for the teams to complete their first innings.
D. B. Deodhar was 48 years and 306 days old when he scored 246 against Bombay. As of 2014, he is the sixth oldest player to score a double century in first class cricket, and the second oldest Indian after C. K. Nayudu who did it at the age of 50 years and 142 days in 1945–46.
 The Bombay – Maharashtra match was scheduled for three days but went to five before the first innings were completed. Maharashtra made 675 and Bombay 650.

Zonal Matches

West Zone

North Zone

East Zone

South Zone

Inter-Zonal Knockout Stage

Final

Scorecards and averages
Cricketarchive

References

External links

1941 in Indian cricket
Indian domestic cricket competitions